Cleaning Up is a British television drama series written and created by Mark Marlow. The six-part series premiered on ITV on 9 January 2019. It stars Sheridan Smith as Sam, a single mother and office cleaner who resorts to insider trading in order to pay her debts.

Plot
Sam Cook is a cleaner at Kramer Lowe, a financial company in Canary Wharf. Struggling to get by on her zero-hour contract with contractor Xenco Clean, she is drowning in debt, addicted to gambling, and faces her ex-husband trying to get full-time custody of their two daughters. After overhearing a stockbroker who is being blackmailed into insider trading, she plunges herself into a shady world of finance.

Cast
Sheridan Smith as Sam Cook, a cleaner for Xenco Clean
Jade Anouka as Jess, Sam's friend and colleague
Kristy Philipps as Alice Cook, Sam and Dave's 15-year-old daughter
Doc Brown as Blake, a Kramer Lowe stockbroker engaging in insider trading
Uriel Emil as Viktor, Sam's boss at Xenco Clean
Robert Emms as Glynn, a lodger at Sam's house
Branka Katić as Mina, a cleaner for Xenco Clean
Neil Maskell as Warren, a debt collector Sam owes money
Anya McKenna-Bruce as Lily Cook, Sam and Dave's 8-year-old daughter
Matthew McNulty as Dave Cook, Sam's ex-husband 
Hero Fiennes-Tiffin as Jake, Alice's boyfriend 
Rosie Cavaliero as Frances Howard, Head of Compliance for Kramer Lowe
Lloyd Owen as Dominic Swanson, a corporate lawyer blackmailing Blake
Angela Wynter as Amber, Jess's mother and cafe owner
Milanka Brooks as Daniela, a cleaner for Xenco Clean
Con O'Neill as Graham, CEO of Westavaris Incorporated, and head of the insider trading network

Production
Marlow, who had no previous credits in television, had been struggling to get an original series produced. Inspired by Oliver Stone's Wall Street, he developed a script around office cleaners, who are often unnoticed. The script was eventually passed onto Featherstone, who commissioned the programme.

Episodes

Reception
The first episode of Cleaning Up received three out of five stars from The Guardians Lucy Mangan, who was critical of weak story development but complimentary of the concept and actors, writing that "... overall, this is the kind of solid, well-made nonsense that is such a rare and precious joy. Indispensable to it are the actors, who throw themselves uncynically into it with their whole hearts. This is always Smith's greatest gift, and here she is surrounded by a supporting cast doing likewise."

References

External links 
 
 Official website

2019 British television series debuts
2019 British television series endings
2010s British drama television series
2010s British television miniseries
English-language television shows
ITV television dramas
Television series by ITV Studios
Television shows set in London